Henning Bommel (born 23 February 1983) is a German professional racing cyclist, who currently rides for UCI Continental team . He rode at the 2015 UCI Track Cycling World Championships.

Major results

Track

2001
 1st  Team pursuit, National Junior Track Championships (with Robert Bengsch, Daniel Musiol and Florian Piper)
 2nd Team pursuit, UCI Juniors Track World Championships (with Robert Bengsch, Karl-Christian Konig and Christoph Meschenmoser)
2002
 2nd Team pursuit, National Track Championships
2003
 3rd Team pursuit, National Track Championships
2004
 National Track Championships
2nd Madison
2nd Team pursuit
2005
 3rd Team pursuit, National Track Championships
 2nd Madison, National Track Championships
2007
 3rd Points race, National Track Championships
2008
 1st  Team pursuit, National Track Championships (with Robert Bartko, Robert Bengsch and Frank Schulz)
2010
 National Track Championships
1st  Team pursuit (with Robert Bartko, Johannes Kahra and Stefan Schäfer)
2nd Madison
2011
 1st  Team pursuit, National Track Championships (with Nikias Arndt, Stefan Schäfer and Franz Schiewer)
2012
 1st  Team pursuit, National Track Championships (with Michel Koch, Kersten Thiele and Yuriy Vasyliv)
 2nd Team pursuit, UEC European Track Championships (with Maximilian Beyer, Lucas Liss and Theo Reinhardt)
2013
 3rd Madison, UCI Track Cycling World Championships (with Theo Reinhardt)
2014
 1st  Team pursuit, National Track Championships (with Theo Reinhardt, Nils Schomber and Kersten Thiele)
 UEC European Track Championships
2nd Team pursuit (with Theo Reinhardt, Leon Rohde, Nils Schomber and Kersten Thiele)
3rd Points race
2015
 1st  Team pursuit, National Track Championships (with Theo Reinhardt, Nils Schomber and Domenic Weinstein)
2017
 National Track Championships
1st  Points race
3rd Team pursuit
2018
 National Track Championships
2nd Madison
2nd Team pursuit

Road
2006
 1st Stage 1 Tour de Serbie
2008
 1st Stage 5 Tour of Bulgaria
2009
 1st  Road race, World Military Road Championships
2010
 2nd Overall Dookoła Mazowska
2012
 3rd Rund um den Sachsenring
2018
 3rd Road race, World Military Road Championships

References

External links
 
 
 
 
 
 

1983 births
Living people
People from Finsterwalde
People from Bezirk Cottbus
German track cyclists
German male cyclists
Cyclists from Brandenburg
Olympic cyclists of Germany
Cyclists at the 2016 Summer Olympics